Gotanda Station is a railway station in Shinagawa, Tokyo, Japan, operated by the East Japan Railway Company (JR East), the private railway operator Tokyu Corporation, and the Tokyo subway operator Toei.

Lines
Gotanda Station is served by the following lines:
 JR East Yamanote Line
 Toei Asakusa Line (Station number A-05)
 Tokyu Ikegami Line - terminus station

Station layout

JR East
The JR East station consists of an elevated island platform serving two tracks. The station has a "Midori no Madoguchi" staffed ticket office.

Chest-height platform edge doors were installed on the Yamanote Line platforms in February 2015, with operation commencing in March.

Tokyu
The Tokyu station consists of one elevated island platform serving two tracks, located above the JR platforms.

Toei
The Toei subway station consists of one underground island platform serving two tracks.

History
The JR station first opened on 15 October 1911. The Tokyu Ikegami Line station opened on 17 June 1928. The Toei Asakusa Line station opened on 15 November 1968.

Station numbering was introduced to the JR East platforms in 2016 with Gotanda being assigned JY23.

Passenger statistics
In fiscal 2013, the JR East station was used by 132,524 passengers daily (boarding passengers only), making it the 24th-busiest station operated by JR East. Over the same fiscal year, the Tokyu station was used by an average of 108,025 passengers daily (entering and exiting passengers), making it the busiest station on the Ikegami Line.

The daily passenger figures for each operator in previous years are as shown below.

 Note that JR East figures are for boarding passengers only.

Surrounding area
 Seisen University
 Rissho University
 Tokyo Health Care University
 NTT Medical Center Tokyo
 Ikedayama Park

See also

 List of railway stations in Japan

References

External links

 JR East station information 
 JR Gotanda Station Map (JR East) 
 Gotanda Station (Toei) 
 Gotanda Station (Tokyu) 

Yamanote Line
Tokyu Ikegami Line
Toei Asakusa Line
Stations of East Japan Railway Company
Stations of Tokyu Corporation
Stations of Tokyo Metropolitan Bureau of Transportation
Railway stations in Tokyo
Railway stations in Japan opened in 1911